Mugil thoburni, Thoburn's mullet, is a species of grey mullet, from the family Mugilidae, found in the eastern Pacific Ocean. It is most common around the Galapagos Islands but does occur on the coasts of Central America and South America as well. This species grows to a length of  TL. It was formerly regarded as the only known member of the genus Xenomugil.

The specific name honours Wilbur Wilson Thoburn (1859-1899), lecturer in bionomics at Stanford University, where David Starr Jordan was president, in recognition of Thoburn's work on the sculpins.

References

thoburni
Taxa named by David Starr Jordan
Taxa named by Edwin Chapin Starks
Fish described in 1896